Vishwanath Chintamani Bedekar (1906–1998), who professionally used the name Vishram Bedekar, was an Indian Marathi-language writer and film director.

Bedekar was born on August 13, 1906 in Amravati. After receiving his college degree in Amravati, he went to Nagpur for his post-graduate studies. During his college days, he was drawn to English literature and theater. He moved to Pune in the 1930s. In 1938, he married Malati Bedekar, (whose maiden name was Balutai Khare).

Literary work
In 1939, Bedekar wrote his only novel Ranangan. It portrayed romantic love between an Indian youth and a German Jewish girl against the backdrop of World War II, and created a storm in literary circles in his times, and was translated into English in 2021. The novel was based on Bedekar’s own experience on an ocean voyage in 1938 from Europe to India in which he encountered a number of Jews fleeing German persecution. Bedekar received in 1985 a Sahitya Akademi Award for his autobiographical Ek Jhad Ani Don Pakshi. He presided over Marathi Sahitya Sammelan in Bombay in 1988.

Bedekar wrote several plays:
 Brahma Kumari (A mythological play with contemporary relevance)
 Naro Wa Kunjaro Wa
 Waje Paul Apule
 Tilak Ani Agarkar

The last play depicted the emotional and intellectual conflict between Bal Gangadhar Tilak and Gopal Ganesh Agarkar.

Movie Direction
Bedekar took a course in cinematography in the U.K. He directed many Marathi and Hindi films. Few of the notable movies are :

 Thakiche Lagna
 Satyache Prayog
 Vasudeo Balwant
 Naradnardi
 Krushnarjun Yuddha
 Chool Ani Mool
 Ramshastri
 Pahila Palna
 Andheri Duniya (Hindi) (1936)
 Lakharani (Hindi) (1945)
 Talaash (Hindi) 1957
 Do Bhai (Hindi) (1961)
 Rustom Sohrab (Hindi) (1963)
 Ek Nanhi Munni Ladki Thi (Hindi) (1970)

References

External links
 Vishram Bedekar passes away
 Battlefield by Vishram Bedekar, tr. by Jerry Pinto
 Biography of Vishram Bedekar

Marathi-language writers
People from Amravati
1906 births
1998 deaths
Recipients of the Sahitya Akademi Award in Marathi
20th-century Indian poets
Poets from Maharashtra
Indian male poets
20th-century Indian male writers
Presidents of the Akhil Bharatiya Marathi Sahitya Sammelan